Terry Donald Yake (born October 22, 1968) is a Canadian former professional ice hockey centre and right wing who played for the Hartford Whalers, Mighty Ducks of Anaheim, Toronto Maple Leafs, St. Louis Blues, and Washington Capitals.

Playing career
After three years with the Brandon Wheat Kings in the Western Hockey League, Yake was drafted by the Hartford Whalers in the 4th round, 81st overall in the 1987 NHL Entry Draft. Yake then returned to the Wheat Kings for one more season, scoring 140 points in 72 games.

The 1988–89 season saw Yake make his professional debut, appearing in 75 games with the Binghamton Whalers of the American Hockey League while also making his NHL debut with the Hartford Whalers, appearing in two games. The next three seasons saw Yake do much of the same; he played the majority of his time in the minors while playing sparingly with Whalers, most notably with the Springfield Indians, for whom Yake scored 77 points in 60 games in 1991 to help lead the Indians to their seventh and final Calder Cup championship.

The 1992–93 season was a breakout year for Yake. He appeared in 66 games with the Whalers and scored an NHL career high 53 points. The 1993–1994 season saw Yake enjoy another solid season. He was claimed by the newly formed Mighty Ducks of Anaheim and was the team's leading scorer for their inaugural season, scoring 52 points.  He scored Anaheim's first hat trick in the team's first road game against the New York Rangers.

Despite leading the team in points, the Mighty Ducks traded Yake to the Toronto Maple Leafs in 1994. His tenure with the Maple Leafs was short lived, however. He appeared in only 19 games the whole year and would not see action in the NHL again until 1997. Yake signed with the Buffalo Sabres in 1996 and played the whole year with the Rochester Americans, scoring 101 points in 78 games.

This play allowed for Yake to sign with the St. Louis Blues in 1997. With the Blues he was able to regain a regular spot in the NHL again. He played 2 full years with the Blues, scoring 25 and 27 points respectively. The 1999–2000 season saw Yake play 26 games with the Blues before being traded to the Washington Capitals, where he appeared in another 35 games. For the 2000–2001 season Yake played in 12 games with the Capitals, playing the majority of the year with the Portland Pirates.

Starting in the 2001–02 season, Yake played three years in the DEL in Germany. Yake then moved to Switzerland's Nationalliga B, where he remained active through the 2009 season.  He was named the player-coach of Lausanne HC of the NLB in 2008, but was fired in the fall of 2009 to end his professional career.

Yake continued to play amateur hockey through the 2015 season, appearing with Allan Cup-winning senior teams in 2012 and 2015.

Personal
Yake currently lives in St. Louis with his wife and two daughters and runs a meat distribution business.

Career statistics

Awards and honours

References

External links

1968 births
Binghamton Whalers players
Brandon Wheat Kings players
Ice hockey people from British Columbia
Canadian ice hockey centres
Denver Grizzlies players
Essen Mosquitoes players
Hartford Whalers draft picks
Hartford Whalers players
Sportspeople from New Westminster
Krefeld Pinguine players
Lausanne HC players
Living people
Mighty Ducks of Anaheim players
Milwaukee Admirals (IHL) players
Nürnberg Ice Tigers players
Portland Pirates players
Rochester Americans players
St. Louis Blues players
Springfield Indians players
Toronto Maple Leafs players
EHC Visp players
Washington Capitals players
Worcester IceCats players
Canadian expatriate ice hockey players in Germany
Canadian expatriate ice hockey players in Switzerland